Lesbian vampirism is a trope in 20th-century exploitation film and literature. It was a way to hint at or titillate with the taboo idea of lesbianism in a fantasy context outside the heavily censored realm of social realism.

Origins and early history
The vampires based in Slavic mythology, the wąpierz, were said to sneak into houses at night and drink the blood of people. 

Countess Elizabeth Bathory also inspired the vampire myth, and her victims were all young women. 

It is believed that these two early additions to vampire lore, real and fictional, have contributed to the mythology of the vampire, in particular an attraction to young, beautiful women present in modern retelling of the vampire mythos.

The portrayal of vampires has had sexual connotations since the Victorian era, but during that era it had more to do with demonising sexual behaviour. The women in Victorian era vampire media were often portrayed as sexually transgressive and then punished for said transgressions. As part of this moral panic, the trope of lesbian vampires appeared to reinforce heteronormativity.

Carmilla and its adaptations

The genre has its roots in Sheridan le Fanu's novella Carmilla about the love of a female vampire for a young woman:

Sometimes after an hour of apathy, my strange and beautiful companion would take my hand and hold it with a fond pressure, renewed again and again; blushing softly, gazing in my face with languid and burning eyes, and breathing so fast that her dress rose and fell with the tumultuous respiration. It was like the ardour of a lover; it embarrassed me; it was hateful and yet overpowering; and with gloating eyes she drew me to her, and her hot lips travelled along my cheek in kisses; and she would whisper, almost in sobs, 'You are mine, you shall be mine, and you and I are one for ever'. (Carmilla, Chapter 4).

Carmilla is a constant presence in the protagonist, Laura's life. Her role evolves from mother to lover, though their relationship revolves around Carmilla feeding on Laura. When Carmilla is discovered later in the novella, the story plays on themes of patriarchy and homophobia as Carmilla is seen to be corrupting and tarnishing these young women.  

Dracula's Daughter (1936) gave the first hints of lesbian attraction in a vampire film, in the scene in which the title character, portrayed by Gloria Holden, preys upon an attractive girl she has invited to her house to pose for her. Universal highlighted Countess Zaleska's attraction to women in some of its original advertising for the film, using the tag line "Save the women of London from Dracula's Daughter!"

Le Fanu's Carmilla was adapted by Roger Vadim as Blood and Roses in 1960. Terror in the Crypt (1964) follows suit, with a portrayal of subtle lesbian attraction between a Karnstein descendant (possessed by Carmilla) and her victim.  More explicit lesbian content was provided in Hammer Studios production of the Karnstein Trilogy of films loosely adapted from Carmilla. The Vampire Lovers (1970) was the first, starring Ingrid Pitt and Madeline Smith. It was a relatively straightforward re-telling of LeFanu's novella, but with more overt violence and sexuality. Lust for a Vampire (1971) followed, with Yutte Stensgaard as the same character played by Pitt, returning to prey upon students at an all-girls school.  This version had her falling in love with a male teacher at the school. Twins of Evil (1972) had the least "lesbian" content, with one female vampire biting a female victim on the breast.  It starred real life identical twins and Playboy Playmates Madeleine and Mary Collinson. Partially due to censorship restraints from the BBFC, Hammer's trilogy actually had fewer lesbian elements as it progressed.

In literature
Charles Busch's play Vampire Lesbians of Sodom is a popular example of the genre. The satirical sketch ran for over five years, making it one of the most successful off-Broadway shows of all time.

The Gilda Stories by Jewelle Gomez features a lesbian who escapes from slavery in the 1850s and becomes inducted into a group of vampires. The novel won two Lambda Literary Awards.

Elfriede Jelinek's stage play Illness or Modern Women, a modern re-telling of Carmilla, has two lesbian vampires as its protagonists. Emily, a wife and nurse, becomes a vampire and transforms her friend, Carmilla, into a vampire as well. The two become lovers and drink the blood of children. Ultimately, they are hunted down by their husbands and murdered.

Among these in a more modern rendition is Pamela Swynford De Beaufort. In both the book series and television adaptation, Pam is portrayed as a bisexual woman who prefers women. Though most of the characters in the Southern Vampire Mysteries experiment with their sexuality, Pam is one of a dozen that falls into the LGBT category, including Sophie-Anne Leclerq and  Tara Thornton, among others.

In film and television
Jesús Franco's 1971 horror film Vampyros Lesbos can be considered one of the most focused exploitation films using the theme of a lesbian vampire. Vampyros Lesbos was referenced by Quentin Tarantino in his 1997 movie Jackie Brown.

A more specialized form of vampire lesbianism involves incestuous attraction, either implied or consummated. The 2007 lucha libre film Mil Mascaras vs. the Aztec Mummy includes a scene involving identical-twin teenage vampire girls who express their attraction to each other as part of an attempt to lure Mil Mascaras into a three-way encounter that is actually a trap.

The genre was also spoofed in the "Lesbian Vampire Lovers of Lust" episode of Dr. Terrible's House of Horrible, a comedy television series. Recent British vampire film Razor Blade Smile (1998), which presents itself partly as a series of homages to and clichés from other vampire films, includes an erotic lesbian vampire scene, as well as similar heterosexual episodes. In the 2001 film Jesus Christ Vampire Hunter, Jesus Christ fights vampires to protect lesbians from becoming a vampire. Another spoof of the genre, entitled Lesbian Vampire Killers, was released in 2009. Blood of the Tribades, released in 2016, is an updated variant on the trope and was described as "a modern take on 70s Euro arthouse and Hammer lesbian vampire movies that...takes on today’s stormy political climate, religious zealotry and gender issues."

Erzsébet Báthory, the historical true-life prototype of the modern lesbian vampire, appears as a character in several films—although not always with the lesbian element—including Daughters of Darkness (1971) by Belgian director Harry Kumel, Hammer Films' Countess Dracula (1971), Immoral Tales (1973) directed by Walerian Borowczyk, The Bloody Countess (Ceremonia sangrienta) (1973) directed by Jorge Grau, and Eternal (2005).

List of films and television programs 
Dracula's Daughter (1936)
Blood and Roses (1960) (French: Et mourir de plaisir, lit. 'And die of pleasure')
Castle of Blood (1964) (Italian: Danza Macabra)
Terror in the Crypt (English: Crypt of the Vampire, Italian: La cripta e l’incubo)
Le viol du vampire (1969) (English: The Rape of the Vampire, also known as The Queen of the Vampires)
The Vampire Lovers (1970)
La Vampire Nue (1970) (English: The Nude Vampire, lit. The Naked Vampire)
Lust for a Vampire (1971) (also known as Love for a Vampire or To Love a Vampire)
Countess Dracula (1971)
Le frisson des vampires (1971) (English: The Shiver of the Vampires, lit. The Thrill of the Vampires)
Daughters of Darkness (1971) (French : Les Lèvres Rouges, in Belgium, Le Rouge aux Lèvres (the former literally translated as The Red Lips and the latter as The Red on the Lips) and in the Netherlands, Dorst Naar Bloed (meaning Thirst for Blood)
Vampyros Lesbos (1971) (Spanish: Las Vampiras)
Twins of Evil (1971) (also known as Twins of Dracula)
The Velvet Vampire (1971) (also known as Cemetery Girls)
 The Blood Spattered Bride (1972) (Spanish: La Novia Ensangrentada lit. The Bloody Bride)
Daughter of Dracula (1972) (French: La fille de Dracula)
Female Vampire (1973) (also known as The Bare Breasted Countess)
Lemora: A Child’s Tale of the Supernatural (1973) (also known as The Legendary Curse of Lemora, and Lemora, Lady Dracula)
Immoral Tales (1973) (French: Contes immoraux)
The Devil's Plaything (1973) (German: Der Fluch der schwarzen Schwestern)
Vampyres (1974)
Sexcula (1974)
Lèvres de sang (1975) (English: Lips of Blood)
Mary, Mary, Bloody Mary (1975)
Alucarda (1977) (Spanish: Alucarda, la hija de las tinieblas, or Alucarda, the daughter of darkness)
Fascination (1979)
The Living Dead Girl (1982) (English: The Living Dead Girl)
The Hunger (1983)
Carmilla (1989)
Blood Countess (1992)
Nadja (1994)
Red Lips (1995)
The Addiction (1995)
Embrace of the Vampire (1995)
Caress of the Vampire (1996)
Caress of the Vampire 2 (1996)
Razor Blade Smile (1998)
Titanic 2000 (1999)
Caress of the Vampire 3: Lust Of The Nightstalker (1999)
Coming Out (2000)
Barely Legal Lesbian Vampires (2003)
Eternal (2004)
Night Fangs (2005)
Vampire Diary (2007)
Lesbian Vampire Killers (2009)
We Are the Night (2010)
The Moth Diaries (2011)
The Unwanted (2014)
Styria (2014)
Blood of the Tribades (2016)
Mother, May I Sleep with Danger? (2016)
The Carmilla Movie (2017)
Bliss (2017)
Bit (2019)
Carmilla (2019)
Theresa & Allison (2019)
First Kill (2022)

See also

The Celluloid Closet
LGBT themes in horror fiction
LGBT themes in speculative fiction
Elizabeth Báthory in popular culture
The island of Lesbos (from which the word "lesbian" comes from) had local traditions about the nature of Greek vampires: they were thought to have long canine teeth much like wolves.
Tracey Wigginton, an Australian murderer nicknamed "the Lesbian Vampire Killer"

References

External links
 "Queer Horror" list of Lesbian vampire films
 "Queer Horror" list of Lesbian vampire books
 ''Vampire Lesbians of Sodom" at Charles Busch website
 Pam Keesey's Daughters of Darkness

Lesbian fiction
Sexuality in fiction
Vampires in popular culture
LGBT themes in horror fiction
Women in horror fiction